Jack O'Neill (March 27, 1923 – June 2, 2017) was an American businessman, often credited with the invention of the wetsuit, and the founder of the surfwear and surfboard company O'Neill.

Early life
O'Neill grew up in Oregon and southern California, where he began body surfing in the late 1930s. He was a Navy pilot during World War II. O'Neill later moved to San Francisco in 1949 and earned a bachelor's degree in liberal arts at San Francisco State University.

Career
In 1952, he founded the O'Neill brand while opening one of California's first surf shops in a garage on the Great Highway in San Francisco, close to his favorite bodysurfing break at the time. 
This led to the establishment of a company that deals in wetsuits, surf gear, and clothing. Jack O'Neill's name is attached to surfwear and his brand of surfing equipment. Although O'Neill is widely believed to be the inventor of the wetsuit, an investigation concluded that UC Berkeley physicist Hugh Bradner was most likely the original inventor.

In December 1996 he began a non-profit organization called O'Neill Sea Odyssey which provides students with hands-on lessons in marine biology and that teaches the relationship between the oceans and the environment. It has hosted about 100,000 children since it started.

Personal life
He was married to Marjorie, who died in 1973, and they had six children.

O'Neill resided on a beachfront property in Santa Cruz, California, from 1959 until his death on June 2, 2017.

His granddaughter Uma O'Neill is a New Zealand-born equestrian rider, who represents that country and holds both New Zealand and American citizenships, she  was selected to compete at the 2020 Summer Olympics.

Awards
In 2002, O'Neill was an EY Entrepreneur of the Year Award recipient for the Northern California Region.

References

Further reading
 
 Ocean Odysseys: Jack O'Neill, Dan Haifley, and the Monterey Bay National Marine Sanctuary

1923 births
2017 deaths
United States Navy pilots of World War II
Businesspeople from Denver
Businesspeople from California
People from Santa Clara, California
Surfing equipment
20th-century American businesspeople
Military personnel from California